The Women's Marathon event at the 2009 World Championships in Athletics took place on August 23, 2009, in the streets of Berlin, Germany. The race started at 11:15h local time.

Medalists

Abbreviations
All times shown are in hours:minutes:seconds

Records

Qualification standards

Schedule

Intermediates

Results

See also
 2009 World Marathon Cup

References

External links
 todor66

Marathon
Marathons at the World Athletics Championships
World Championships
Women's marathons
World Championships in Athletics marathon
Marathons in Germany